Bachelor No. 2 or, the Last Remains of the Dodo is the third album by the American singer-songwriter Aimee Mann, released on May 2, 2000. Mann's record label, Geffen Records, refused to release it, feeling it contained no hit singles; in response, Mann set up her own label, SuperEgo, and released it herself. It sold  270,000 copies, a large number for an independent artist, and received acclaim. Some songs were previously released on the Magnolia soundtrack (1999).

Background 
Aimee Mann recorded her first two solo albums, Whatever (1993) and I'm With Stupid (1995), under contract to Imago Records. When Imago encountered financial problems, they sold the albums to Geffen Records. According to Pitchfork, Mann's first two albums showed that she was "a witty, self-possessed songwriter", but they did not meet sales expectations, with sales "in the low six figures". Mann began to be seen as someone whose career was in decline. She received wider recognition after she contributed songs to the soundtrack for the 1999 film Magnolia, including some songs later included on Bachelor No. 2.

Writing 
Mann's frustration with Geffen inspired many of the songs on Bachelor No. 2. She described playing her new songs to Geffen staff, who would complain that they did not sound like commercial singles. She said: "You just feel like you're failing all the time. The upshot of that is that I started to be unable to write because their reaction made me feel like I wasn't good enough, and so I just started to have a lot of writer's block ... I think the only way to deal with that kind of situation is just to write about what you’re feeling." She wrote "Nothing is Good Enough" in response. 

Mann took more control over the production of Bachelor No. 2 than she had for her previous albums. She collaborated again with the multi-instrumentalist Jon Brion, and said: "It’s very easy to just sit back and let Jon go. So this was the only record that I really took responsibility for all the music: all the parts that were played, the way everything sounded." The dodo of the album title reflected Mann's sense that singer-songwriters were a "dying breed" in 2000.

Release 
Geffen refused to release Bachelor No. 2, feeling it contained no hit singles. In response, Mann sold homemade EPs of her music on tour, a move she described as a "DIY fuck-you-record-company-I'm-selling-it-myself" gesture. When Geffen gave her the opportunity to leave her record contract, she took it; she said later: "I could not have gotten out of there fast enough."

In 1998, the Sony employee Gail Marowitz predicted that Mann would make more money selling 70,000 albums independently than by selling 300,000 on a major label. In 1999, Mann and her manager, her former 'Til Tuesday bandmate Michael Hausman, formed their own label, SuperEgo Records, and bought the Bachelor No. 2 masters from Geffen. Mann sold 25,000 copies via mail order from her website, a large amount for an independent artist. After she secured a distribution deal, Bachelor No. 2 sold more than 270,000 copies, outperforming I'm With Stupid. Pitchfork described this as a "decisive victory". As of May 2008, Bachelor No. 2 had sold more than 230,000 copies in the US.

In 2019, Mann released an expanded 20th-anniversary reissue of Bachelor No. 2 for Record Store Day.

Reception 
On the review aggregator website Metacritic, Bachelor No. 2 has a score of 89 out of 100 based on 13 reviews, indicating "universal acclaim". According to Metacritic, it is the 28th best-reviewed album and the ninth best-reviewed indie/alternative album of the decade. Slant Magazine named it the 10th-best album of the decade.

Track listing 
All songs by Aimee Mann, except where noted.
 "How Am I Different" (Jon Brion, Mann) – 5:03
 "Nothing Is Good Enough" – 3:10
 "Red Vines" – 3:44
 "The Fall of the World's Own Optimist" (Elvis Costello, Mann) – 3:06
 "Satellite" – 4:10
 "Deathly" – 5:37
 "Ghost World" – 3:30
 "Calling It Quits" – 4:09
 "Driving Sideways" (Michael Lockwood, Mann) – 3:49
 "Just Like Anyone" – 1:22
 "Susan" – 3:51
 "It Takes All Kinds" (Brion, Mann) – 4:06
 "You Do" – 3:43

Personnel

Musicians
 Aimee Mann – Vocals (1-13), Backing Vocals (1-4,7-9,11), Bass (1-8,10-13), Acoustic Guitar (1,3,6,8,10-13), Nashville Guitar (1), Guitar (7), Tambourine (7,11), Bad Hi-Hat (11)
 Jon Brion – Electric Guitar (4,6), Keyboards (4), Backing Vocals (6), Drums (6)
 Mark Flannagan – trumpet (8)
 Juliana Hatfield – Backing Vocals (6)
 Michael Hausman – Tambourine (3), Drum Programming (13)
 Buddy Judge – Backing Vocals (1-5,7,8,12,13), Drum Programming (1,3,8), Wurlitzer (8), drum Loops (8)
 Hank Linderman - Drum Programming (11)
 Michael Lockwood – Electric Guitar (1,3,4,7-9,12,13), Guitar (5,6,11), Percussion (5), Backing Vocals (9), 12-String Acoustic Guitar (9), Cheesy Keyboards (13)
 Dan MacCarroll - Drums (3,9,11)
 Ric Menck – Drums (2,8)
 Brendan O'Brien – Bass (9), Slide Guitar (9)
 Michael Panes - Violin (10)
 Michael Penn – Backing Vocals (1,5,9,11), Slide Guitar (3), Feedback Guitar (5), Electric Guitar (9), Guitar (13)
 Grant Lee Phillips – Backing Vocals (1,5)
 John Sands – Drums (1,4,5,7,12)
 Clayton Scoble – Electric Guitar (4)
 Benmont Tench –Chamberlin (3), Piano (8)
 Jennifer Trynin – Electric Guitar (7)
 Patrick Warren – Keyboards (1,5,7,11,12), Piano (3,9), Chamberlin (3,8,10,13), Guitar (6), Accordion (10), Celeste (13)

Production 
 Producers: Aimee Mann, Jon Brion, Mike Denneen, Buddy Judge, Brendan O'Brien
 Executive producer: Michael Hausman
 Engineers: Mike Denneen, Nick DiDia, Ryan Freeland, S. "Husky" Höskulds, Dustin Jones, Buddy Judge, Hank Linderman, Brian Scheuble
 Assistant engineers: Elijah Bradford, Carlos Castro, Connie Hill, Dustin Jones
 Mixing: David Boucher, Bob Clearmountain, Ryan Freeland
 Mastering: Shawn R. Britton
 Extensive Help with Production: Buddy Judge
 Assistants: David Boucher, Ryan Freeland
 Computers: Buddy Judge
 Drum engineering: Hank Linderman
 Vocal engineer: S. "Husky" Hoskulds
 Art direction: Aimee Mann, Gail Marowitz
 Design: Aimee Mann, Gail Marowitz

References

External links 
 

2000 albums
Aimee Mann albums
Albums produced by Jon Brion
Albums produced by Brendan O'Brien (record producer)
SuperEgo Records albums
Self-released albums